The Ambassador of Malaysia to the Swiss Confederation is the head of Malaysia's diplomatic mission to Switzerland. The position has the rank and status of an Ambassador Extraordinary and Plenipotentiary and is based in the Embassy of Malaysia, Berne.

List of heads of mission

Ambassadors to Switzerland

See also
 Malaysia–Switzerland relations

References 

 
Switzerland
Malaysia